SS Harpalion was a British steamship built in 1910 and sunk during World War I. It was built by William Gray & Co., Ltd.

Sinking
Harpalion was torpedoed 6.5 miles West of the Royal Sovereign LV on 24 February 1915 with the loss of three of the crew. The loss of the ship was mentioned in The Times.

References

1910 ships